Nouveau Riche (NR) was a musical group which included Ulrich Bermsjö and Dominika Peczynski, who was later replaced by Camilla Brink. The group was created by Bermsjö and Peczynski, an ex-member of Army Of Lovers, in 2005.

Their debut single "Oh Lord", written by Bermsjö and Mattias Lindblom together with Anders Wollbeck from Vacuum, was released in November 2005. It was followed by the single "Hardcore Life", after which Peczynski decided to leave the band.
While for a short period the future of Nouveau Riche seemed uncertain, Pick Up Music announced the group would continue with Camilla Brink replacing Peczynski.

The first single with Camilla in the group was "Angels", and the debut album "Pink Trash" was subsequently released.

Their website and Myspace page make no mention of Peczynski or the fact that there have been two previous singles before "Angels" and when Camilla joined the group. Pick Up Music have not issued any statements regarding this.

There has been no news or new material issued by the group since the single "Stay", for which there was no physical release, in 2007, but in December 2008, American label ISV Entertainment released the "Stay E.P.", a collection of remixes for the song and previously released and unreleased mixes for other album songs.

Members 
Dominika Peczynski (2005–2006)
Ulrich Bermsjö
Camilla Brink (2006–present)

Discography

Albums
Pink Trash (2007)

Singles
Oh Lord (2005)
Hardcore Life (2006)
Angels (2007)
Stay (2007)
Stay E.P. (2008)

Promotional videos
Oh Lord (2005)
Angels (2007)
Stay (2007)

Related artists
Army of Lovers
Vacuum
BWO

See also
List of Swedes in music

External links
Official website
Band's official Myspace
Semi-official website with early information and press info about the band, including sound clips
Dominika's official website

Swedish pop music groups
Swedish dance music groups